Shin Ryu (1619–1680) was a general of the Joseon dynasty. He was born into a yangban family of the Pyeongsan Shin lineage in modern-day Chilgok County, Gyeongsangbuk-do, near where his shrine now stands in Yangmok-myeon. He passed the military gwageo in 1645, and went on to hold various state positions. In 1654, he was appointed commander (cheomsa, 僉使) of Hyesan in Joseon's northern border province of Hamgyeongbuk-do.

1658 expedition
Shin is best remembered today for his role in Joseon's 1658 expedition against Russian forces led by Onufriy Stepanov in Manchuria. His diary of this expedition, in which roughly 200 Joseon forces from Hamgyeongbuk-do armed with matchlocks joined with a smaller number of Qing forces commanded by Šarhūda to repel the Russian expedition, is one of only two the "Diary of the northern expedition" (북정일기, 北征日記). His forces successfully repelled Russian expedition forces led by Onufriy Stepanov and Russian expedition forces recorded 270 deaths, including Onufriy Stepanov. A modern edition was published in 1980. A Russian translation of his account is available as well; according to the Russian translator and the author of the comments, a particular significance of this document is that it represents the first ever written account about an encounter between Koreans and Russians.

See also
Military history of Korea
Manchus-Cossacks wars
History of Korea
List of Koreans

References

External links
Invil profile of Shin's shrine
칠곡군:  고장의 인물
Editorial discussing the legacy of the 1658 expedition
  Manchu-Korean expedition against Russian expansion (나선정벌 (羅禪征伐)
  map of the Manchu-Korean expedition against Russian expansion (나선정벌 (羅禪征伐)
  map of the Manchu-Korean expedition against Russian expansion 
   Manchu-Korean expedition against Russian expansion (나선정벌 (羅禪征伐)

1619 births
1680 deaths
Korean generals
17th-century Korean people
Sin clan of Pyongsan